MV Heidelberg was built in 2004. Carrying only 110 passengers in 56 cabins.

External links 
 Heidelberg

References 

Cruise ships
2004 ships